Bo van Wetering (born 5 October 1999) is a Dutch female handballer for Odense Håndbold and the Dutch national team.

She represented the Netherlands at the 2019 World Women's Handball Championship.

Achievements
Eredivisie:
Winner: 2017

Awards and recognition
 All-Star Left Wing of the EHF Junior European Championship: 2017

References

External links

1999 births
Living people
People from Heerhugowaard
Dutch female handball players
Expatriate handball players
Dutch expatriate sportspeople in Germany
Handball players at the 2020 Summer Olympics
Dutch expatriate sportspeople in Denmark
Sportspeople from North Holland
21st-century Dutch women